Johannes Petrus Maria "Jan" van der Ploeg (4 July 1909, in Nijmegen – 4 August 2004, in Nijmegen) was a Dutch Dominican specialist in Hebrew, Dead Sea Scrolls and Syriac manuscript research. He was Professor of Old Testament and Semitics at the Catholic University of Nijmegen (1951–1979) after which time he spent most of his time in Kerala, and was raised to the dignity of chorbishop (or chorepiscopus) in the Syriac Catholic Church in 1963.

In 1958 he became member of the Royal Netherlands Academy of Arts and Sciences.

Selected publications 
Oud-Syrisch Monniksleven, Leiden, 1942.
Vondsten in de Woestijn van Juda, 1957; Engl. transl.: The Excavations at Qumran: A Survey of the Judaean Brotherhood and its Ideas, 1958; German transl., 1959.  
Editio princeps, Aramaic Job Targum from Qumran, 1971.
The Christians of St. Thomas and their Syriac Manuscripts (Placid Lecture Series, 3), Bangalore, 1983.
The Book of Judith (Daughter of Merari), (Môrân 'Ethô Series3, Baker Hill, Kottayam, 1991.

References

 Festschrift for 70th Birthday.

1909 births
2004 deaths
Linguists from the Netherlands
Old Testament scholars
Dutch Dominicans
20th-century Dutch Roman Catholic priests
Academic staff of Radboud University Nijmegen
Members of the Royal Netherlands Academy of Arts and Sciences
Rectors of universities in the Netherlands
Syriac Catholic clergy
20th-century linguists